The Hilton Brighton Metropole is a 4-star hotel and conference centre located on the seafront in Brighton, East Sussex.

The architect was Alfred Waterhouse, who also was architect of University College London and the Natural History Museum, London.

Currently the UK's largest residential conference centre in the South of England, it was built in 1890 and has 340 bedrooms. The General Manager is Sascha Koehler who has worked with Hilton for 20 years. The hotel has 5 elevators which 3 serve the tower block floors. The 2 original elevators were originally manually controlled and the other 3 were added in the 1970s including the luggage elevator. All 5 elevators were installed by Otis Elevator Company.

Since 2000, the hotel has been operated by Hilton Hotels & Resorts (previously it operated under the Stakis brand), and previously owned by The Royal Bank of Scotland, its freehold is now owned by the Topland Group.

Flats addon 1960s-1970s

In the 1960s or 1970s a 2 story flat block was built on top of the hotel for residential use. The flats are your typical 1960s tower block style building and when the apartments were built onto the hotel
It is referenced in section 3, "The Fire Sermon" of T. S. Eliot's The Waste Land.

Notes

Bibliography

Alfred Waterhouse buildings
Exhibition and conference centres in England
Brighton
Hotel buildings completed in 1890
Hotels established in 1890
Hotels in Brighton and Hove